The men's 100 kilograms (Half heavyweight) competition at the 2002 Asian Games in Busan was held on 30 September at the Gudeok Gymnasium.

Schedule
All times are Korea Standard Time (UTC+09:00)

Results
Legend
WO — Won by walkover

Main bracket

Repechage

References
2002 Asian Games Report, Page 461

External links
Official website

M100
Judo at the Asian Games Men's Half Heavyweight